Eugen Carl Kaufmann or Eugene Charles Kent (8 January 1892 in Frankfurt am Main – 21 June 1984 in London) was German-born English Jewish architect.

From 1925, he was engaged at the New Frankfurt project under the leadership of Ernst May. Later, he joined in a city planning with E. May, at the invitation of the Soviets. From there he went to London where he opened his own architectural office.

References

External links 
 https://web.archive.org/web/20070628021930/http://www.ikg.uni-karlsruhe.de/projekte/exilarchitekten/architekten/kent.htm 

Architects from London
British urban planners
Jewish architects
1892 births
1984 deaths
Jewish emigrants from Nazi Germany to the United Kingdom
Architects from Frankfurt